The rusty-backed spinetail (Cranioleuca vulpina) is a Neotropical species of bird in the Furnariidae (ovenbird) family. The taxon from Panama is considered a separate species, the Coiba spinetail (C. dissita).

It is found in most of central and northern South America and southern Central America including Bolivia, Brazil, Colombia, Ecuador, Guyana, Panama, Peru, Suriname, and Venezuela.
Its natural habitats are subtropical or tropical moist lowland forests and subtropical or tropical moist shrubland and is most commonly found in dense undergrowth or vine covered forests  The population has been reported in decline due to predation by invasive species but is not believed to be approaching the thresholds for vulnerable status.

References

rusty-backed spinetail
Birds of Colombia
Birds of Venezuela
Birds of the Amazon Basin
Birds of Brazil
rusty-backed spinetail
rusty-backed spinetail
Taxonomy articles created by Polbot